Arovo (Ar) is a rural locality (a village) and the administrative centre of Arovsky Selsoviet, Chishminsky District, Bashkortostan, Russia. The population was 594 as of 2010. There are 16 streets.

Geography 
Arovo is located 18 km east of Chishmy (the district's administrative centre) by road. Chernigovka is the nearest rural locality.

References 

Rural localities in Chishminsky District